The Police Overseas Service Medal is an award in the Australian honours system. The award is presented to members of an Australian police force in recognition of service undertaken with an international peace-keeping organisations or following a request for assistance from a foreign government. The award was introduced by letters patent on 25 April 1991. In 2013 the criteria were amended to also include service by regular and patrol officers of the Royal Papua New Guinea Constabulary. Recipients of the medal are not entitled to any post-nominal letters.

Description
The Police Overseas Service Medal features a globe of the world surmounted by a branch of wattle, which is Australia's national floral emblem. The globe is centred on Cyprus, the first international deployment of Australian police.  The rim of the medal is a chequerboard pattern, which symbolises police forces across the world. The circular, nickel-silver medal is ensigned with the Crown of St Edward. The back of the medal displays a Federation Star. The words 'Police Overseas Service Medal' are inscribed around the rim. The 32 mm-wide ribbon consists of alternating squares of black and white in the chequerboard pattern commonly representative of police services.

Clasps
Nineteen clasps have been declared for the Police Overseas Service Medal as of 2022. These are:

See also
 Australian Honours Order of Precedence

References

External links
 Gazetted Regulations
 Police Overseas Service Medal, www.pmc.gov.au

Civil awards and decorations of Australia
Awards and honours of Australian law enforcement agencies
1991 establishments in Australia
Awards established in 1991